Bela Bhatia is an independent writer and researcher, human-rights lawyer and activist practicing in the District courts of Bastar division, south Chhattisgarh, India.

Biography
She was born in a middle-class, upper-caste Punjabi Hindu family. As a step against the caste system, she converted to Buddhism at Deekshabhumi, Nagpur, in 2003. Her doctoral thesis was on 'The Naxalite Movement in Central Bihar' (Faculty of Social and Political Sciences, University of Cambridge, 2000). 

Prior to turning to academics, she was a full-time rights activist for nearly a decade in a sangathan (collective) of landless agricultural labourers and marginal farmers in Bhiloda taluka of Sabarkantha district (Gujarat) and a peace activist in autonomous peace movements in Iraq and Palestine.

She first came to Bastar in 2006 when she began studying the ongoing war between the Indian state and the Communist Party of India (Maoist) and continued to visit regularly in the following years. She moved to live in Bastar in January 2015 and has been working there on an independent basis since. Police-linked vigilante organisations harassed her for her human-rights work on several occasions in 2016–17. Twice, through mass actions, they tried to get her evicted from her rented home in a village and force her to leave Bastar.  

She has been an Associate Fellow at the Centre for the Study of Developing Societies, Delhi and an Honorary Professor at the Tata Institute of Social Sciences, Bombay. Her research interests have included questions related to the lives of dalits, adivasis, and other marginalised communities of rural India. She has been particularly interested in understanding poverty, inequality, injustice and resistance movements.     

She is amongst the 121 Indians who were targeted through WhatsApp using Israeli cyber-surveillance NSO Group's notorious Pegasus spyware in 2019 and one of the five Pegasus targeted civilians globally who are part of the WhatsApp legal case against NSO in a US court (December 2020).

She is co-author (with Mary Kawar and Mariam Shahin) of Unheard Voices: Iraqi Women on War and Sanctions (London: Change, 1992), co-editor (with Jean Drèze and Kathy Kelly) of War and Peace in the Gulf: Testimonies of the Gulf Peace Team (London: Spokesman, 2001) and co-author (with other members of the 'expert group' set up by the Planning Commission, Government of India) of 'Development Challenges in Extremist Affected Areas' (2 vols, 2008); the first draft of this report was written by K. Balagopal and herself.

She considers herself to be a feminist, libertarian socialist, and global citizen.

References

External links 
, Bela Bhatia attacked in Bastar, interview with Bela Bhatia (video)
Footnotes on citizenship from rural India by Bela Bhatia (video)
Corruption and Change in India, interview with Bela Bhatia (video)
Articles by Bela Bhatia in Economic and Political Weekly

Living people
Date of birth missing (living people)
Alumni of the University of Cambridge
Indian human rights activists
21st-century Indian women writers
21st-century Indian writers
Indian women journalists
Journalists from Chhattisgarh
People from Bastar district
Indian political journalists
Women writers from Chhattisgarh
1963 births